Rosario District may refer to:

 Peru:
 Rosario District, Acobamba, in Acobamba province, Huancavelica region
 Costa Rica
 Rosario District, Desamparados, in Desamparados (canton), San José province
 El Rosario District, in Naranjo (canton), Alajuela province

See also
 Rosario (disambiguation)